Banco Bilbao Vizcaya Argentaria, S.A., better known by its initialism BBVA, is a Spanish multinational financial services company based in Madrid and Bilbao, Spain. It is one of the largest financial institutions in the world, and is present mainly in Spain, South America, Turkey and Italy and Romania.

The bank was founded as Banco de Bilbao, on May 28, 1857, in Bilbao. BBVA's operational headquarters are located in Madrid, in the "Ciudad BBVA" complex. It is Spain's third largest bank after Banco Santander and Caixabank. It is listed on the Madrid Stock Exchange, the New York Stock Exchange and on the Mexican Stock Exchange. It is also a part of the IBEX 35 as well as the Dow Jones EURO STOXX 50.

As of December 31, 2022, BBVA's assets amounted to around €713 billion, making it the third largest Spanish financial institution by volume of assets. At that same date, it had 6,040 offices, 115,615 employees and 89.3 million customers, and was present in more than 30 countries. On April 2, 2018, it was ranked the 42nd largest bank in the world by total assets.

History in Spain

Banco de Bilbao and Banco de Vizcaya 
The history of BBVA began in 1857 in Bilbao, a city located in the Basque part of northern Spain, when the Board of Trade promoted the creation of Banco de Bilbao as an issuing and discount bank.

Banco de Vizcaya was founded in 1901 and carried out its first operations in Bilbao. Little by little, it spread throughout the country.

In 1988, the merger agreement between Banco de Bilbao and Banco de Vizcaya was signed. And in 1989, the BBV brand was adopted.

Merger of BBV and Argentaria: Creation of BBVA 
In 1991, the Spanish government of Felipe González created the public bank Argentaria, grouping in it the Spanish public banks. Subsequently, between 1993 and 1998 the process of privatization of the entity was carried out. BBV and Argentaria announced their merger project on October 19, 1999, with the aim of continuing to create value. The new bank (BBVA) was born with a significant size, a strong financial solvency and a large financial structure, an adequate geographical diversification of business and risks and, as a consequence of all this, a greater potential for profit growth.

Acquisitions of Unnim Banc and Catalunya Banc 

After several years dedicated to external growth, BBVA takes advantage of the restructuring of the financial system in Spain to grow especially in Catalonia, one of the regions where it had the lowest market share. To this end, it acquired between 2012 and 2014 the two financial groups nationalized by the Government of Spain (Unnim Banc and Catalunya Banc), which grouped 6 Catalan savings banks.

Digital transformation 
In 2007, the firm started an initiative to digitally transform the bank. Following implementation, it saw a 19% year-on-year increase in new customers. As of 2015, the total number of these clients stood at 14.8 million.

In 2019, BBVA decides to unify its brand worldwide and introduces a new logo. This meant the disappearance of local names in Argentina (Francés), Mexico (Bancomer), Peru (Continental), and the United States (Compass). Garanti Bank, the Group’s franchise in Turkey, changed its name to Garanti BBVA.

In January 2021, BBVA said that it was looking for plans to lower the costs, then  in February 2021, it was reported that BBVA is planning to cut around 3000 jobs in Spain after a fall of 48% of its net profit in the fourth quarter of 2020.

Credit ratings
As of January 2023, BBVA had the following debt ratings with the four major rating agencies:

International expansion 

The international presence of BBVA began in 1902, when the Banco de Bilbao opened a branch in Paris and in 1918 another in London, thus becoming the first Spanish bank with a presence abroad. In the 1970s, Banco de Bilbao, Banco de Vizcaya and Banco Exterior were configured as international groups, with the installation of operational and representative offices in the financial capitals of Europe, America and Asia. Likewise, the bank initiated a policy of expansion in America through the purchase of local banks in various countries of the continent.

In 2019 the Bank changed its name to BBVA, dropping local brand names in Argentina (Francés), Mexico (Bancomer), Peru (Continental), and the United States (Compass). In addition to the rebranding, Garanti in Turkey was renamed to Garanti BBVA.

Latin America 
The Banco de Vizcaya acquired the Commercial Bank of Mayagüez in Puerto Rico in 1979, a bank founded in 1967 by a group of merchants and industrialists. When it became BBVA Puerto Rico, in 1992 it began a growth stage through acquisitions, which gave rise to BBVA Puerto Rico.

In 1995, the group entered Peru, with the privatization and subsequent acquisition of Banco Continental, and in Mexico, with the purchase of Probursa, which later merged with BBVA Bancomer to form the financial group BBVA Bancomer that operates in the banking and insurance sector.

In 1996, it entered Colombia, with the acquisition of Banco Ganadero and in Argentina, with the acquisition of BBVA Francés. It also makes new acquisitions in Mexico, buying Banca Cremí and Banco de Oriente.

In 1997, BBVA entered Venezuela by acquiring the Provincial Bank, which had been founded in 1953. He also expanded his presence in Argentina with the acquisition of Banco de Credito Argentino. It also enters into the pension funds business in Bolivia, founding BBVA Previsión AFP.

In 1998, the bank installed in Chile after buying Banco BHIF, and AFP Provida one year later. It also enters Brazil with the purchase of Banco Excel-Econômico, and in Argentina he buys the insurer Consolidar, created in 1994.

In 2000, the merger of BBV Probursa with Bancomer occurred in Mexico to create BBVA Bancomer, the first bank in the country by volume of assets. At the beginning of 2004, the Group announced the takeover bid for 100% of the shares of Bancomer that did not yet belong to BBVA, buying all the shares of the Mexican bank. In 2004 it acquires 100% of Hipotecaria Nacional, a private entity specialized in the mortgage business.

In 2001, the implementation of the unified platform for all businesses and all countries was completed, and the BBVA brand was installed in the Group's entities in Latin America.

In 2004, the banks of Chile (BHIF) and Colombia (Banco Ganadero) changed their commercial denomination and were simply called BBVA.

In 2006, through a public auction, it acquired the old savings and housing corporation, Banco Granahorrar de Colombia, whose shares belonged to the Grancolombian group, and with the financial and economic crisis of the late 90s it passed into the hands of the state through Fogafin. Later he merged with BBVA Colombia, creating one of the largest banking groups in the country.

In 2017 BBVA acquires the Mexican company Openpay, startup fintech specializing in online payments.

As of July 6, 2018 Scotiabank Chile takes control of BBVA Chile, with which the legal trademark will be renamed as Scotiabank Azul until its full integration with Scotiabank. The total change was made in October 2018.

United States
In 2004, the Group began another line of international expansion with entry into the US market, with acquisitions of entities in the south of the country (Sunbelt region), taking advantage of the strength of its Mexican subsidiary BBVA Bancomer.

In the second quarter of the year, the Group announced the purchase of Valley Bank in California through BBVA Bancomer.

In 2005, it bought the Banco Laredo (located in Texas), and in 2006 the Texas Regional Bancshares (Texas State Bank).

In 2007, BBVA acquired Alabama Compass Bank in the US, strengthening its franchise in that country. Later, BBVA unified its corporate image in the country by reorganizing its entire portfolio of brands under the name "BBVA Compass".

In 2009, it acquired the Guaranty Bank in Texas, following the collapse of this entity.

In 2014, BBVA acquired the US digital banking company Simple for 117 million dollars. In its push towards a digital future in 2015 acquired the California company Spring Studio, specializing in user experience and digital design.

By 2018, BBVA USA was one of the 30 largest banks in the US.

In 2020, BBVA USA  was sold to PNC Financial Services for 11.6 Billion dollars.

Turkey 
In 2010, the Group acquired 24.9% of the capital of Turkiye Garanti Bankasi AS, the second largest bank in Turkey, and reached an agreement with the Dogus Group — the reference shareholder of Garanti — to manage the entity jointly. Subsequently, this participation increased to 25.01%. In November 2014, BBVA acquired an additional 14.89% of the Garanti bank from Dogus Holdings for 1,988 million euros, bringing its share to 39.9% of the entity.

In February 2017, it reached a new purchase agreement with Dogus to acquire 9.95% more from the Garanti bank for 859 million euros. Increasing its participation to 49.85% .

On November 15, 2021, BBVA offered to purchase the remaining shares 50.15% of shares in Garanti bank. In May 2022, BBVA reaches 86% stake in Garanti BBVA.

Italy 
In 2021 the bank virtually opened in Italy.

Presence on stock market indexes

IBEX 35
BBVA is included in the IBEX 35, the official index of the Spanish Continuous Market composed of the 35 most liquid stocks traded on continuous market. The BBVA has a market capitalization of 15,816 million euros (09-30-20) with a share value between 5 and 8 euros.

Eurostoxx 50
BBVA bank lists in Eurostoxx 50 along with other banks like Santander Bank and Deutsche Bank.

NYSE
BBVA bank is listed on the New York Stock Exchange.

Mexican Stock Exchange
BBVA bank is listed on the Mexican Stock Exchange.

U.S. sports market presence
On 13 September 2010 BBVA became an official sponsor of the NBA. From 2011 to 2014, BBVA sponsored the Birmingham Bowl, a postseason college football game played in Birmingham, Alabama, during which time the game was known as the BBVA Compass Bowl. For the first three editions under the sponsorship contract, the game featured teams from the Big East Conference and Southeastern Conference. Following the 2013 split of the Big East along football lines, the former Big East berth was inherited by that conference's football-sponsoring offshoot, the American Athletic Conference. On 12 May 2012, BBVA Compass Stadium opened in downtown Houston, Texas. It was built as the home for the Houston Dynamo soccer team, and from its opening has also hosted the Texas Southern University football team. Since 2014, the stadium has also hosted home games of the Houston Dash, a team in the National Women's Soccer League owned and operated by the Dynamo.

Emerging and growth-leading economies (EAGLEs)

Emerging and growth-leading economies (EAGLEs) are a grouping of key emerging markets developed by BBVA Research.  The EAGLE economies are expected to lead global growth in the next 10 years, and to provide important opportunities for investors.

See also

 BBVA Rising Stars Challenge NBA exhibition basketball game
 BBVA Foundation Frontiers of Knowledge Award annual science and humanities award since 2009
 Big Four (Spanish banking)
 List of banks in Spain

References

External links

 
 BBVA Foundation 

 
1999 establishments in Spain
Banks established in 1999
Banks of Spain
Basque companies
Companies listed on the Madrid Stock Exchange
IBEX 35
Multinational companies headquartered in Spain
Spanish brands
Organisations based in Bilbao
Companies in the Euro Stoxx 50
Banks under direct supervision of the European Central Bank